Cedar Brook may refer to the following in the U.S. state of New Jersey:

Cedar Brook, a tributary of Cranbury Brook in Middlesex County
Cedar Brook, New Jersey, an unincorporated area in Camden County

See also
Cedarbrook (disambiguation)